Jalan Panchor (Johor state route J137) is a major road in Johor, Malaysia.

List of interchanges

Roads in Johor